Luthrodes contracta, the small Cupid, is a small butterfly that belongs to the lycaenids or blues family. It is found in southern Turan, southern Ghissar, Iran, Afghanistan, Pakistan, Sri Lanka and southern, central and north-west India. The species was first described by Arthur Gardiner Butler in 1880.

See also
List of butterflies of India
List of butterflies of India (Lycaenidae)

References

Polyommatini
Butterflies described in 1880
Butterflies of Asia
Taxa named by Arthur Gardiner Butler